Baccharis pteronioides  is a North American shrub in the family Asteraceae known by the common name yerba de pasmo. It is widespread in Mexico (from Chihuahua to Oaxaca) and also found in the southwestern United States (Arizona, New Mexico, western Texas).

Baccharis pteronioides  is a shrub up to 100 cm (40 inches) tall, with thick, leathery leaves and many small flower heads. It grows in dry woodlands, grasslands, and canyons.

References

External links
Vascular Plants of the Gila Wilderness
Pollen Library
Virginia Tech, tree identification, yerba de pasmo Asteraceae Baccharis pteronioides DC

pteronioides
Flora of North America
Plants described in 1836